Harrow College is a further education college in England with two campuses, in Harrow and Harrow Weald. It was established in 1999 by the merger of two tertiary colleges; in 2017 it legally merged with Uxbridge College, and in 2023 merged with Richmond upon Thames College, forming Harrow, Richmond & Uxbridge Colleges (HRUC).

Harrow College is (as of 2013) medium-sized and had over 2,400 full-time and 4,700 part-time learners. It also forms part of the London Borough of Harrow's  Harrow Sixth Form Collegiate.

History
The college can date back to the early 20th century; Harrow County School for Girls was founded in Lowlands Road near Harrow town centre in 1914, while Harrow Weald County Grammar School was opened in Brookshill, Harrow Weald in 1933. Until the 1970s these were grammar schools before a re-organisation turned them into sixth form colleges called Lowlands and Harrow Weald respectively.

In 1987 the tertiary colleges Greenhill College and Weald College were established in their place when the borough of Harrow adopted a tertiary provision system. A third tertiary college called Elm Park College was also established, while the former Hatch End-based Harrow College for Further Education closed down to make way for these, and the Catholic St Dominic's Sixth Form College remained unaffected by the tertiary system. Greenhill and Weald colleges eventually merged on 1 August 1999, creating Harrow College.

On 1 August 2017, Harrow College merged with Uxbridge College to form Harrow College & Uxbridge College (HCUC).

On 4 January 2023, HCUC merged with Richmond upon Thames College to form Harrow, Richmond & Uxbridge Colleges (HRUC).

Location

Teaching takes place at the Harrow on the Hill campus on Lowlands Road and at the Harrow Weald campus in Harrow Weald as well as two smaller, dedicated construction-focused units; Whitefriars Centre and Harrow Skills Centre.

In 2015, the college opened two new buildings: The Enterprise Centre at the Harrow on the Hill campus and Spring House for supported learning at the Harrow Weald campus.

Harrow College has been awarded a Centre of Excellence for the Hearing Impaired, which is the only centre of its kind in North West London. The college is also a member of the Westminster Centre of Excellence in Teacher Training (CETT).

It holds the Pre School Learning Alliance kite mark.

Curriculum
Harrow College provides academic and vocational courses for young people and a range of professional and non-professional programmes for adult students. 
The college is highly regarded for its ESOL (English for speakers of other languages) and EFL (English as a Foreign Language) courses. The EFL programmes are accredited by the British Council.
The Learning Links programme has set a standard in the community for providing courses for students with learning disabilities and difficulties.

Alumni

The list includes former students of Greenhill College and Weald College.

Jon Foo, actor and martial artist
Shami Chakrabarti, former director of Liberty
Kevin Fong, TV presenter
Tom Fletcher, guitarist in McFly
Richard Hounslow, British slalom canoeist
 Vilma Jackson (performance artist and actor)
Matt Lucas, comedian
Faye McClelland, British triathlete
Mark Ramprakash, English cricketer
Master Shortie, rapper
Paul Staines, political blogger under the name Guido Fawkes
Jordanne Whiley, paralympian
Ricardo P. Lloyd, British actor

Harrow County Grammar School for Girls
Diane Abbott
Carole Jordan
Lucy Oldfield

Harrow Weald County Grammar School
 Michael Annals, costume designer
 Sir John Baker CBE, former Chief Executive from 1990 to 1995 and chairman from 1995 to 1997 of National Power
Dudley Bright, Principal Trombone, London Symphony Orchestra
Spencer Campbell, television producer and director
 Ken Follett, spy novel author
 Robert Glenister, actor
 Gareth Hadley, Chairman of the General Optical Council
 Christopher Isham, theoretical physicist at Imperial College London, who investigates quantum gravity
 Prof Anne Jones FRSA, Professor of Lifelong Learning from 1995 to 2001 at Brunel University
 Prof Roger Kain CBE, Montefiore Professor of Geography at the School of Advanced Study (SAS)
 Ronald Lacey, actor, who played Harris in Porridge
 Prof David Pearce (economist), Professor of Economics from 1983 to 2004 at UCL
 Merlyn Rees, Home Secretary from 1976 to 1979 and Labour MP from 1962 to 1983 for Leeds South and from 1983 to 1992 for Morley and Leeds South (and later taught economics at the school for eleven years throughout the 1950s)
 Michael Rosen, author
 Prof Anthony Thirlwall, Professor of Applied Economics from 1976 to 2004 at the University of Kent, known for Thirlwall's Law
 Nigel Waymouth, designer

Former teachers
 James N. Britton, taught English at Harrow Weald GS from 1933 to 1938
 Harold Rosen (educationalist) (Harrow Weald Grammar School)

References

External links
Harrow College website
The Matrix Standard

Further education colleges in London
Education in the London Borough of Harrow
Educational institutions established in 1999
1999 establishments in England